The finals and the qualifying heats of the Women's 4×100 metres Freestyle Relay event at the 1993 FINA Short Course World Championships were held in Palma de Mallorca, Spain.

Final

See also
1992 Women's Olympic Games 4x100m Freestyle Relay
1993 Women's European LC Championships 4x100m Freestyle Relay

References
 Results

R